Mark Henrich (born 22 July 1961) is a German sprinter. He competed in the men's 4 × 400 metres relay at the 1988 Summer Olympics, representing West Germany.

References

1961 births
Living people
Athletes (track and field) at the 1988 Summer Olympics
German male sprinters
Olympic athletes of West Germany
Place of birth missing (living people)
Universiade bronze medalists for West Germany
Universiade medalists in athletics (track and field)